White Sunday is a holiday in Samoa.

White Sunday may also refer to:
 White Sunday (Latin: Dominica in albis), another name for the Second Sunday of Easter
 White Sunday (often contracted to "Whitsun"), a British/Irish name for the feast of Pentecost
 White Sunday (album), a 2003 rap album by Mareko